The Rosary Murders is a 1987 American mystery crime film directed by Fred Walton and starring Donald Sutherland, Charles Durning, Belinda Bauer, and Josef Sommer. Its plot follows a series of gruesome murders occurring within a Detroit Roman Catholic parish. It is based upon the 1979 novel of the same name by William X. Kienzle. Kienzle received screenplay credit, as did Elmore Leonard.

Plot
In a Roman Catholic parish in Detroit, a series of murders begins in rapid succession: first, Father James Lord is killed on Ash Wednesday by an unknown assailant who unplugs the respirator in his hospital room. Shortly after, Sister Ann Peschal informs her superior, Father Robert Koesler, that she intends to leave the convent, as she has fallen in love with a man and wishes to marry him. The next morning, she is found by Koesler stabbed to death in her bathtub. A third victim, Father Dailey, is shot to death inside a confessional booth in the chapel. With each killing, the assailant leaves behind a black rosary in the victim's hand.

Pat Lennon, a journalist for the local newspaper, is appointed to cover the murders, and strikes up a friendship with Koesler, who himself has experience working with the city's Catholic press. Later, Koesler angers his superior, Father Nabors, after performing a baptism on an infant born out of wedlock. Koesler is unnerved when a man who claims to be the killer visits his confessional and blames the church for his teenage daughter's death three years prior. Koesler is shaken by the encounter, and conflicted about reporting it to authorities, as a priest is morally forbidden from breaking the seal of confession. Later, Father Killeen is struck by the killer with a car while running in an unpopulated industrial area of the city; the killer emerges from the car and shoots Killeen before placing a rosary in his hand.

Koesler begins investigating, searching for records of a sixteen-year-old girl's death. He eventually finds records of a Katherine Javison, whom he learns attended a Catholic school. Speaking with staff, he learns that Katherine fell into an inexplicable deep depression in the last year of her life before committing suicide. Koesler attempts to speak with Sister Margaret Mary, Katherine's school advisor, but is informed that she took a vow of silence after Katherine's death. Next, Koesler visits the Javison home but receives no response upon knocking on the door; he climbs through a window into Katherine's bedroom, which has remained unchanged since her death. Koesler notices a black rosary in the room, as well as a ceiling lamp and rope that Katherine used to hang herself. Katherine's father catches Koesler in the house, but allows him to depart unharmed.

Meanwhile, Father Steele is called to give communion to a shut-in, and is escorted by police, only to be murdered inside the house. Later, Koesler unwittingly gives confession to Pat, who confesses her romantic feelings for him. When he attempts to phone her, he learns she has left Detroit. Koesler manages to arrange a meeting with Sister Mary Margaret at the cloister. She initially communicates with a notepad, before relenting and speaking aloud: She informs Koesler that Katherine confided in her that she and her father had an incestuous relationship. Mary Margaret refused to believe the accusation, but felt profound guilt after Katherine killed herself. Moments after Koesler leaves, Sister Mary Margaret is shot to death in the kitchen by an apparent repairman. Koesler and two policemen hear the gunfire and rush to her aid, but the killer shoots both officers to death and escapes.

At the police station, Koesler studies an evidence board displaying the serial killer's victims, and realizes that each victim's name has a connection to one of the Ten Commandments. Koesler surmises that Nabors may be the next victim (based upon the commandment "Thou shall not bear false witness against thy neighbor"), but Father Nabors manages to perform a Good Friday service without incident. After the service, Koesler witnesses Robert Javison arrive at the church to make a confession. Javison confesses to Nabors that he had forced his daughter into incest with him, before drawing a gun to kill Nabors; however, the murder attempt is botched when police, observing from outside, shoot Javison to death through a window. After, Koesler is given a letter found in Javison's pocket; it is Katherine's suicide note in which she states her goodbyes, and that she forgives her father.

Cast

Production
The film was shot in Detroit, at Holy Redeemer parish, a century old Roman Catholic church on Detroit's Southwest side.  Musician Jack White makes an uncredited appearance as a young altar boy.

Release
The Rosary Murders was distributed by New Line Cinema, and premiered in Detroit on August 27, 1987, opening in New York City and Los Angeles the following day, August 28.

Critical reception
In the Los Angeles Times, film critic Kevin Thomas wrote:The Rosary Murders is an instance of good writing matched by firm, understated direction and some splendid playing from a large cast. In contrast to Walton’s spine-tingling When a Stranger Calls, The Rosary Murders is low-key yet can jolt you out of your seat--even on a second viewing. Sutherland, his hair silvered and close-cropped, radiates intelligence in one of the most substantial, reflective roles of his career. No matter that Durning always seems perfect casting as a priest, for he’s so skillful that he makes each time seem the first.
The Detroit Free Press named the film #32 of "the 50 most essential movies set in Michigan."

References

External links
 
 
 
 
 

1979 American novels
1987 films
1980s crime thriller films
1980s serial killer films
American crime drama films
American crime thriller films
American films about revenge
American independent films
American neo-noir films
American mystery films
American serial killer films
Films about Catholic priests
Films about Catholicism
Films about suicide
Films based on American novels
Films based on mystery novels
Films directed by Fred Walton (director)
Films set in Detroit
Films set in Michigan
Films shot in Michigan
Films with screenplays by Elmore Leonard
Incest in film
The Samuel Goldwyn Company films
1980s English-language films
1980s American films